Nematopogon pilella is a moth of the Adelidae family. It is found in almost all of Europe, except Portugal, Spain and Slovenia.

The wingspan is 13–16 mm.  Head is orange, face whitish. Forewings less elongate, shining greyish-ochreous or light fuscous, faintly darker-strigulated. Hindwings grey ; cilia grey.

The larvae possibly feed on the dead leaves of Vaccinium species. They live within a movable case.

References

External links
 Images representing Nematopogon pilella at Consortium for the Barcode of Life

Moths described in 1775
Adelidae
Moths of Europe
Moths of Asia